Richard Frank may refer to:

 Richard N. Frank (1923–2015), American restaurant owner
 Richard Frank (actor) (1953–1995), American actor
 Richárd Frank (born 1990), Hungarian footballer
 Richard B. Frank (born 1947), American military historian
 Richard H. Frank, former president of Walt Disney Studios
 Richard M. Frank, former CEO of Chuck E. Cheese
 Richard A. Frank (1936–2014), American lawyer and administrator of the National Oceanic and Atmospheric Administration
 Richard G. Frank, American healthcare economist and academic
 Richard Frank (priest) (b1970) Archdeacon of Middlesex since 2020

See also
Richard Franck (disambiguation)